Edoardo Severgnini (13 May 1904 – 6 February 1969) was an Italian cyclist. He competed in the sprint event at the 1928 Summer Olympics.

References

External links
 

1904 births
1969 deaths
Italian male cyclists
Olympic cyclists of Italy
Cyclists at the 1928 Summer Olympics
Cyclists from Milan